This article is a list of diseases of sorghum (Sorghum bicolor).

Bacterial

Fungi 

{| class="wikitable" style="clear"
!  colspan=2| Fungal diseases
|-
|Acremonium wilt
||
Acremonium strictum 
 Cephalosporium acremonium'
|-
|Anthracnose (foliar, head, root and stalk rot)
||Colletotrichum graminicolaGlomerella graminicola [teleomorph]
|-
|Charcoal rot
||Macrophomina phaseolina|-
|Crazy top downy mildew
||Sclerophthora macrospora 
 Sclerospora macrospora|-
|Damping-off and seed rot
||Aspergillus spp.Exserohilium spp.Fusarium spp.Penicillium spp.Pythium spp.Rhizoctonia spp.
and other species.
|-
|Ergot
||Sphacelia sorghiClaviceps sorghi 
|-
|Fusarium head blight, root and stalk rot
||Fusarium moniliformeGibberella fujikuroi [teleomorph]
Other Fusarium spp.
|-
|Grain storage mold
||Aspergillus spp.Penicillium spp.
and other species.
|-
|Gray leaf spot
||Cercospora sorghi|-
|Latter leaf spot
||Cercospora fusimaculans|-
|Leaf blight
||Setosphaeria turcica Exserohilum turcicum [anamorph] 
 Helminthosporium turcicum|-
|Milo disease (Periconia root rot)
||Periconia circinata|-
|Oval leaf spot
||Ramulispora sorghicola|-
|Pokkah Boeng (twisted top)
||Gibberella fujikuroi var. subglutinans Fusarium moniliforme var. subglutinans [anamorph]
|-
|Pythium root rot
||Pythium graminicola 
Other Pythium spp.
|-
|Rough leaf spot
||Ascochyta sorghi|-
|Rust
||Puccinia purpurea|-
|Seedling blight and seed rot
||Colletotrichum graminicolaExserohilum turcicumFusarium moniliformePythium aphanidermatumOther Pythium spp.
|-
|Smut, covered kernel
||Sporisorium sorghi 
 Sphacelotheca sorghi|-
|Smut, head
||Sphacelotheca reiliana 
 S. holci-sorghi|-
|Smut, loose kernel
||Sporisorium cruentum 
 S. cruenta|-
|Sooty stripe
||Ramulispora sorghi|-
|Sorghum downy mildew
||Peronosclerospora sorghi 
 Sclerospora sorghi|-
|Tar spot
||Phyllachora sacchari|-
|Target leaf spot
||Bipolaris cookei 
 Helminthosporium cookei|-
|Zonate leaf spot and sheath blight
||Gloeocercospora sorghi|-
|}

 Nematodes 

 Viruses 

 Phytoplasma 

 Insects 
Insect pests include:

 Root feeders 
White grubsHolotrichia serrataLachnosterna consanguineawireworms (Elateridae, Tenebrionidae)
underground burrowing bugs, Stibaropus spp.
termitesOdontotermes spp.Microtermes sp.
antsMonomorium salomonisPheidole sulcaticeps Seedling pests 
shoot fly, Atherigona soccatacutworm, Agrotis ipsilon Stem borers and leaf feeders 
spotted stalk borer, Chilo partelluspink borer, Sesamia inferensarmyworm, Mythimna separataSpodoptera exemptacaterpillars Amsacta albistriga, Amsacta lactinea, Euproctis virguncula, Cnaphalocrocis patnalis, and Mocis frugalischrysomelid leaf beetles Chaetocnema indica, Longitarsus spp., and Phyllotreta chotonicaash weevil Myllocerus undecimpustulatus maculosusgrasshoppers, Nomadacris septemfasciata, Acrida exaltata, Aiolopus longicornis, Aiolopus simulatrix, Aiolopus thalassinus, Atractomorpha crenulata, Chrotogonus hemipterus, Diabolocatantops axillaris, Hieroglyphus banian, and Hieroglyphus nigrorepletusgrasshopper Conocephalus maculatus (eastern India)
grasshopper Hieroglyphus nigrorepletus (western India)

 Sucking pests 
shoot bug Peregrinus maidis (transmits two viral diseases, maize mosaic virus (MMV) and maize stripe virus (MStpV))
corn aphid Rhopalosiphum maidissugarcane leafhopper Pyrilla perpusillahemipterous bugs, Cletus punctiger, Dolycoris indicus, Empoasca flavescens, Lygaeus spp., Menida histrio, Nephotettix virescens, and Nezara viridulathrips, especially Caliothrips indicus, Sorghothrips jonnaphilus Earhead pests 
sorghum midge Stenodiplosis sorghicolaearhead bug Calocoris angustatusbugs, like Dysdercus koenigii and Nezara viridulalepidopteran caterpillars are found feeding on developing grains: Autoba silicula, Cryptoblabes gnidiella, Cydia spp., Conogethes punctiferalis, Ephestia cautella, Eublemma spp., Euproctis limbata, Euproctis subnotata, Helicoverpa armigeramaize cob borer Stenachroia elongella, especially in east India
beetle species, Chiloloba acuta, Mylabris pustulata, and Cylindrothorax tenuicollis Grain pests Sitophilus spp. (attacks stored grains)

 Africa 
The following pest species are reported for sorghum crops in northern Mali.Atherigona soccata (sorghum shoot fly, a major pest): The larvae cut the growing point of the sorghum leaf.Agonoscelis pubescens is also reported as a sorghum pest.Busseola fusca (maize stem-borer; Lepidoptera, Noctuidae) attacks maize and sorghum, and occurs especially at higher altitudes. It is a common pest in East Africa, but has also spread to West Africa.Chilo partellus (spotted stem-borer; Lepidoptera, Crambidae): introduced, from East Africa but spreading. The larvae attack sorghum and maize. Present at low and mid altitudes.Contarinia sorghicola (sorghum midge or cecidomyie du sorgho in French; Diptera, Cecidomyiidae): The adult resembles mosquitoes. Larvae feed on developing ovaries of sorghum grains.Melanaphis sacchari (sugar cane aphid) attacks sorghum.Sitophilus zeamais (maize weevil) and Sitotroga cerealella'' (Angoumois grain moth) attack stored sorghum and maize.

See also 
List of insect pests of millets
List of pearl millet diseases

References 

Common Names of Diseases, The American Phytopathological Society (APS)

Sorghum